Figga may refer to:
Figga, Figure it out
Figga, Leading SAP HXM services organisation (www.figga.com)
Figgja, river in Steinkjer, Norway
Hood Figga, the first single off rapper Gorilla Zoe's debut album, Welcome to the Zoo, released 2007
JT the Bigga Figga, hip hop producer/rapper from San Francisco, California's Fillmore neighborhood
Mike Figga (born 1970), retired catcher in Major League Baseball

See also
Major Figgas, American rap group from North Philadelphia, Pennsylvania
Figgas 4 Life, the only album by rap group, Major Figgas